California Passage is a 1950 American Western film directed by Joseph Kane starring Forrest Tucker, Adele Mara and Estelita Rodriguez.

Plot

Cast
 Forrest Tucker as Mike Prescott 
 Adele Mara as Beth Martin 
 Estelita Rodriguez as Maria Sanchez 
 Jim Davis as Lincoln 'Linc' Corey 
 Peter Miles as Tommy Martin 
 Charles Kemper as Sheriff Willy Clair 
 Bill Williams as Bob Martin 
 Rhys Williams as John Norris 
 Paul Fix as Whalen 
 Francis McDonald as County Recorder Joe Kane 
 Eddy Waller as Waiter 
 Charles Stevens as Pedro 
 Iron Eyes Cody as Indian 
 John Compton as Henchman 
 Al Bridge as Conover
 Ruth Brennan as Stella

References

Bibliography
 Pitts, Michael R. Western Movies: A Guide to 5,105 Feature Films. McFarland, 2012.

External links

1950 films
1950 Western (genre) films
American Western (genre) films
Films directed by Joseph Kane
Films scored by Nathan Scott
Republic Pictures films
American black-and-white films
1950s English-language films
1950s American films